Peter Wirth (born December 3, 1961) is an American attorney and politician serving as a member of the New Mexico Senate, first elected in 2009. He previously served in the New Mexico House of Representatives from 2005 to 2009.

Early life and education
Wirth was born in Stanford, California, the eldest son of John Wirth, a historian and professor of Latin American studies. Wirth's uncle, Tim Wirth, served as a member of the United States Senate from Colorado. Wirth graduated from Stanford University in 1984 with a Bachelor of Arts degree in economics and Spanish. He earned his Juris Doctor from the University of New Mexico School of Law in 1990.

Career 
Wirth works as an attorney and professional mediator.

New Mexico Senate
On November 19, 2016 Wirth was elected as the Democratic Leader by Senate Democratic Caucus and therefore Senate Majority Leader in the New Mexico State Senate for the 53rd Legislature. He previously served as the Chair of the Senate Conservation Committee from 2013 to 2016, Vice-Chairman of the Senate Judiciary Committee from 2011 to 2012, and Vice-Chairman of the Senate Rules Committee from 2011-2012.

Wirth has repeatedly introduced a bill to lower the corporate tax rate but raise revenue by closing loopholes.

References

External links
 Senator Peter Wirth – (D) at New Mexico Legislature
 Representative Peter Wirth - (D) at New Mexico Legislature
 
 Biography at Ballotpedia

1961 births
21st-century American politicians
Living people
Democratic Party New Mexico state senators
People from Stanford, California
Stanford University alumni
University of New Mexico School of Law alumni
Democratic Party members of the New Mexico House of Representatives